Arthur Lavert Dilworth (September 21, 1894 – January 29, 1952) was an American Negro league outfielder in the 1910s.

A native of Jacksonville, Florida, Dilworth made his Negro leagues debut in 1916 with the Bacharach Giants. He played for the Hilldale Club and the Lincoln Giants in 1918, and returned to the Bacharach club to finish his career in 1919. Dilworth died in Mount Vernon, New York in 1952 at age 57.

References

External links
Baseball statistics and player information from Baseball-Reference Black Baseball Stats and Seamheads

1894 births
1952 deaths
Bacharach Giants players
Hilldale Club players
Lincoln Giants players
Baseball outfielders
Baseball players from Jacksonville, Florida
20th-century African-American sportspeople